This is a list of Azerbaijan football transfers in the summer transfer window, 9 June - 31 August 2018, by club. Only clubs of the 2018–19 Azerbaijan Premier League are included.

Azerbaijan Premier League 2018-19

Gabala

In:

Out:

Keşla

In:

Out:

Neftchi Baku

In:

Out:

Qarabağ

In:

Out:

Sabah

In:

Out:

Sabail

In:

Out:

Sumgayit

In:

Out:

Zira

In:

Out:

References

Azerbaijan
Azerbaijani football transfer lists
2018–19 in Azerbaijani football